

Tibet is a landlocked region in Asia. See definitions of Tibet.

Tibet region 
 The Tibetan Plateau, a geographical region in Asia
 The Tibet Autonomous Region of the People's Republic of China
 Central Tibetan Administration, organization created on 29 May 2011 based on the 2011 Charter Of Tibetans in Exile
 Historical periods or states:
 Tibet (1912–1951), the de facto independent entity between 1912 and 1951
 Tibet under Qing rule
 Tibet under the Ganden Phodrang government or regime established by the 5th Dalai Lama
 Phagmodrupa, Rinpungpa and Tsangpa Dynasties
 Tibet under Yuan rule
 The Tibetan Empire from the 7th to 9th centuries
 Pre-Imperial Tibet, the Yarlung dynasty before the rise of the Tibetan Empire
 Neolithic Tibet

South Asia 
 Great Tibet, a former name of Ladakh
 Little Tibet, a former name of Baltistan

Other places 
 Tibet, Georgia, an unincorporated community in Georgia, United States

People 
Tibet (cartoonist), pseudonym of Gilbert Gascard (1931–2010), a Franco-Belgian comic creator
David Tibet (born 1960), British poet and musician
Kartal Tibet (1938–2021), Turkish actor and film director

Other uses 
 Tibet: The Roleplaying Game, a historical fantasy role-playing game

See also
 South Tibet 
 Free Tibet (disambiguation)
 Tibetan
 Tibetans
 Tebet (disambiguation)

Tibet